Navje Memorial Park, the redesigned part of the former St. Christopher's Cemetery, is a memorial park in Ljubljana, the capital of Slovenia. It is located in the Bežigrad district, just behind the Ljubljana railway station.

History

St. Christopher's Cemetery
St. Christopher's Cemetery was blessed in May 1779 by Johann Karl von Herberstein, the Bishop of Ljubljana, and was located in the area of today's Exhibition and Convention Centre. Between the late 18th century and the early 20th century, it was the central town cemetery. In 1906, a new cemetery was established next to Holy Cross Church and most new burials gradually took place there. After 1926, burials no longer took place at St. Christopher's Cemetery, and it was destroyed in 1955 together with the two churches associated with it in order to create a fairground for the 7th Congress of the Communist Party of Yugoslavia. The various remains that were gathered from the site were transferred to a nearby common grave at what was intended to be the Baraga Seminary, and only Jernej Kopitar and Ivan Tušek were actually reburied in Navje.

Design
In the 1930s, a small portion of the old cemetery, including the arcade porch that was built around 1865, was transformed in a "pantheon" of famous Slovenes. The memorial park was designed by the architects Jože Plečnik and Ivo Spinčič in collaboration with the gardener Anton Lah. Already in 1932, Plečnik had proposed building a monumental church on the same site, which would include a crypt with tombs of prominent Slovenes. The project, planned together with his student Edvard Ravnikar, was however rejected, and so Plečnik proposed the creation of Navje Memorial Park.

Later history
Between 1936 and 1940 several gravestones and tombstones of notable personalities were moved into the park, but because of the Axis invasion of Yugoslavia in April 1941 the project was never completed. Many of the gravestones planned to be moved into Navje Memorial Park, such as those of Prešeren, Trubar, Maister, and Rusjan, were not brought in, and many graves of unimportant individuals, planned to be moved to Žale, have remained in the park. Plečnik's plans to enlarge the park were never carried out. After World War II, the park was largely neglected and renovation took place only in the 1990s.

Prominent gravestones 

Notable people's gravestones displayed at Navje Memorial Park include:

Anton Aškerc (1856–1912), poet
Josef Blasnik (1800–1872), editor
Janez Bleiweis (1808–1881), politician, known as "The Father of the Nation"
Matija Čop (1797–1835), philologist and the closest friend and collaborator of the poet France Prešeren
Karel Dežman (1821–1889), historian and politician
Mihael Dežman (1783–1833), merchant
Jurij Flajšman (1818–1874), composer
Ivan Grohar (1867–1911), painter
Johann Nepomuk Hradeczky (1775–1846), Mayor of Ljubljana (1820–1846)
Luka Jeran (1818–1898), Roman Catholic priest and missionary, founder of the Salesians of Don Bosco in the Slovenia
Josip Jurčič (1844–1881), novelist and editor
Jernej Kopitar (1780–1844), philologist
Anton Korošec (1872–1940), politician
Emil Korytko (1813–1839), Polish ethnologist and political activist
Fran Levstik (1831–1887), writer and political activist
Anton Tomaž Linhart (1756–1795), playwright and historian
Kašpar Mašek (1794–1873), Slovene-Czech composer
Fran Maselj (pen name: Podlimbarski, 1851–1917), author and officer of the Austro-Hungarian Army
Anton Nedvěd (1829–1896), Slovene-Czech composer
Josef Ressel (1793–1857), Bohemian engineer and inventor of the naval propeller
Simon Rutar (1851–1903), historian
Edo Šlajmer (1864–1935), physician, founder of modern surgery in Slovenia
Josip Stritar (1836–1923), poet and literary critic
Ivan Tušek (1835–1877), natural scientist and writer
Valentin Vodnik (1758–1819), poet and editor

References 

Parks in Ljubljana
Cemeteries in Slovenia
Bežigrad District
18th-century establishments in Carniola
1770s establishments in the Habsburg monarchy
1779 establishments in Europe
Jože Plečnik buildings
Buildings and structures completed in 1936
20th-century architecture in Slovenia